A foldable smartphone (also known as a foldable phone or simply foldable) is a smartphone with a folding form factor. It is a modern flip phone. Some variants of the concept use multiple touchscreen panels on a hinge, while other designs utilise a flexible display. Concepts of such devices date back as early as Nokia's "Morph" concept in 2008, and a concept presented by Samsung Electronics in 2013 (as part of a larger set of concepts utilizing flexible OLED displays), while the first commercially available folding smartphones with OLED displays began to emerge in November 2018.

Some devices may fold out on a vertical axis to into a wider, tablet-like form, but are still usable in a smaller, folded state; the display may either wrap around to the back of the device when folded (as with the Royole FlexPai and Huawei Mate X), or use a booklet-like design where the larger, folded screen is located on the interior, and a screen on its "cover" allows the user to interact with the device without opening it (such as the Samsung Galaxy Fold series). Horizontally-folding smartphones have also been produced, typically using a clamshell form factor.

The first generation of commercially released foldable smartphones faced concerns over their durability, as well as their high prices.

History

In 2006, Polymer Vision showed a roll-able concept and a foldable smartphone, the Readius (zh), at the Mobile World Congress (MWC) which also serves as a reader.

In 2008, Nokia presented animated concepts of a flexible device it dubbed "Morph", which had a tri-fold design that could be bended into various forms, such as a large unfolded device, a feature phone-sized unit, and a smart wristband. In a 2019 retrospective on the concept, CNET noted that Morph could be considered a forerunner to the first wave of commercially produced folding phones, as well as a showcase of future possibilities.

In 2011, Kyocera released a dual-touchscreen Android smartphone known as the Echo, which featured a pair of 3.5-inch touchscreens. When folded, the top screen continued to face the user while covering the secondary screen. Two individual apps could be shown on the displays, a single app could span across them, while specific apps also featured "optimized" two-pane layouts. Two years later, NEC released the Medias W in Japan. Unlike the Echo, the secondary screen could be folded behind the phone. The camera rotated with the screen so that the same sensor could face both forward and rear  In 2017, ZTE released the Axon M with a similar hinge to the Medias W. ZTE stated that the more powerful hardware of modern smartphones, and improvements to multitasking and tablet support on Android, helped to improve this experience.

The development of thin, flexible OLED displays enabled the possibility for new designs and form factors. During its Consumer Electronics Show keynote in 2013, Samsung presented several concepts—codenamed Youm - for smartphones incorporating flexible displays. One such concept was a smartphone that could fold outward into a single, uninterrupted tablet-sized display. The first Youm concept to make it to a production model was the Galaxy Note Edge—a phablet with a portion of the screen that sloped over the right-hand bezel.

Speculation surrounding the development of folding phones using OLED displays began to emerge more rapidly in 2018. In January 2018, it was reported that LG Electronics had obtained a design patent for a folding smartphone. Later in June, it was reported that Microsoft had been developing a similar device as part of its Surface line, codenamed "Andromeda" (itself a spiritual successor to a dual-screen booklet tablet prototype Microsoft had been exploring in the late-2000s known as Courier), while Samsung was also said to be developing such a device.

In November 2018, the Chinese startup Royole released the first commercially available foldable smartphone with an OLED display, the Royole Flexpai. It featured a single 7.8-inch display that folds outwards, leaving the display exposed when folded. Later that month at its developers' conference, Samsung officially teased a prototype of its folding smartphone, which would be produced "in the coming months". The prototype used a booklet-style layout, with an "InfinityFlex" display located on the inside of the device, and a smaller "cover" screen on the front of the device to allow access when the screen is closed. At a concurrent developers' summit, Android VP of engineering Dave Burke stated that the next version of the platform would provide enhancements and guidance relevant to folding devices, leveraging existing features.

In January 2019, Xiaomi CEO Lin Bin published a video on Sina Weibo, featuring him demonstrating a prototype smartphone with two flaps capable of being folded inward. Samsung officially unveiled the Galaxy Fold during its media event at Mobile World Congress in February 2019. Alongside the Galaxy Fold, the convention also saw other foldable phones being unveiled or teased, such as the Huawei Mate X, and TCL presenting various prototype concepts featuring its "DragonHinge" technology (including a bracelet-styled device). LG did not unveil a folding device, citing a desire to focus more on re-gaining market share in the smartphone market. It did, however, unveil a "Dual Screen" case accessory for its LG V50 smartphone—a folio-styled case containing a secondary display panel inside.

Other companies expressed interest in the concept, or have received patents on designs (such as hinge implementations and overall designs) relating to foldable phones. Motorola Mobility had received patents for a horizontal folding smartphone reminiscent of clamshell feature phones.

In April 2019, the impending launch of the Galaxy Fold was met with quality concerns from critics, after widespread reports of review units experiencing varying forms of display failure (in some instances caused by accidental removal of a plastic layer meant to protect the screen in lieu of glass, along with other failures). Samsung indefinitely postponed the device's release, stating that it needed time to investigate the failures and improve the device's durability. Huawei also delayed its Huawei Mate X, with the company citing its desire to take a "cautious" approach due to the Samsung Galaxy Fold. 

In November 2019, Motorola unveiled its horizontal-folding Razr—inspired by its former Razr feature phone line released on 6 February 2020.
 Samsung also announced a similar device known as the Galaxy Z Flip.

Huawei announced the Mate Xs on 24 February 2020 as a hardware revision of the original Mate X; it was released in "global markets" outside China in March 2020. The device features a more durable display, improved hinge function and a redesigned cooling system, as well as the newer Kirin 990 5G SoC and Android 10 with EMUI 10. Samsung later revealed the  Samsung Galaxy Z Fold 2 in September 2020.

On 25 February 2021, Huawei released the Huawei Mate X2.
In March 2021, Xiaomi Technology announced the Xiaomi MIX Fold.
In August 2021, the Samsung Galaxy Z Fold 3 and Samsung Galaxy Z Flip 3 were released.
On 15 December 2021, OPPO announced the OPPO Find N.

On 11 April 2022, Vivo introduced the Vivo X Fold. On 11 August, 2022, Xiaomi released the Xiaomi MIX Fold 2.
The Samsung Galaxy Z Fold 4 and Samsung Galaxy Z Flip 4 were announced at the August 2022 edition of Galaxy Unpacked. The Galaxy Z Fold 4 was released on 25 August 2022, and the Galaxy Z Flip 4 was released on 26 August 2022.

Motorola Mobility launched the Moto Razr 2022 on 11 August 2022, it is currently only available to the Chinese market but there is speculation that it could become available to other world markets at a later date.

Components

Display materials 

Foldable smartphones typically use flexible, plastic OLED displays rather than glass (such as Corning's Gorilla Glass product, which is used in the majority of mid and high-end smartphones). Plastic displays are naturally capable of sustaining the required bend radius for a foldable smartphone, but they are more susceptible to blemishes and scratches than traditional glass smartphone displays. Although Corning does produce a flexible glass product known as Willow Glass, the company states that its manufacturing process requires use of a salt solution—thus making it unsuitable for electronic displays because the salt can damage the transistors used in OLED panels (which are built directly on the panel).

Samsung marketed its Galaxy Z Flip as featuring -thick "ultra-thin glass" with a plastic layer similar to the Galaxy Fold, manufactured by Samsung with materials from Schott AG, which is "produced using an intensifying process to enhance its flexibility and durability", and injected with a "special material up to an undisclosed depth to achieve a consistent hardness".  A stress test by YouTube channel JerryRigEverything showed the screen was scratched when rubbed with a pick with a Mohs rating of 2 (in comparison, most smartphones tested by the channel begin to experience scratches with 6 and 7-rated picks), placing its durability in line with other folding phones. However, The Verge did note Samsung's statement that the device contained a protective polymer layer similar to that of the Galaxy Fold.

See also

References

Mobile phones
Tablet computers
Crossover devices
Foldable smartphones